Patrick Henry Aquino (born May 30, 1971) is a Filipino basketball coach who serves as the head coach of the Philippines women's national basketball team, he has been appointed by the Samahang Basketbol ng Pilipinas since December 2014 when the team have a new corporate backer Ever Bilena, replacing long-time mentor Haydee Ong. This is the second time that Aquino has coached a national team, Aquino was once manned coaching duties for the Philippines women's national under-19 basketball team. Among his coaching achievements for promoted into Level 1 of 2017 FIBA Asia Women's Championship.

Playing career
Aquino spent his collegiate basketball career for the UP Fighting Maroons in the UAAP from 1988 to 1993 under coach Rey Madrid and also played for the Blu Detergent team in the Philippine Basketball League (PBL).

Coaching career
Aside from his playing stint with Ever Bilena on the men's side, Aquino also coached the Ever Bilena women's team that bring home the grand slam victories in the now-defunct Women's Philippine Basketball League (WPBL) in 1998 and 1999.

He has also coached the NU Lady Bulldogs in the University Athletic Association of the Philippines (UAAP) until 2022.

Aquino then became the head coach of the Philippines women's national basketball team, appointed by the Samahang Basketbol ng Pilipinas This is the second time that Aquino has coached a national team, Aquino was once manned coaching duties for the Philippines women's national under-19 basketball team. Among his coaching achievements for promoted into Level 1 of 2017 FIBA Asia Women's Championship.

References

1971 births
Living people
Filipino men's basketball coaches
Filipino men's basketball players
UP Fighting Maroons basketball players
Blackwater Bossing coaches